Rogue, a member of the X-Men in American comic books published by Marvel Comics, has been included in almost every media adaptation of the X-Men franchise, including films, television series and video games.


Television

 Rogue appears in X-Men: The Animated Series, voiced by Lenore Zann. This version is a confident and flirtatious Southern belle who is in a romantic relationship with Gambit.
 Rogue will return in X-Men '97.
 Rogue appears in the Spider-Man episodes "The Mutant Agenda" and "Mutants' Revenge", voiced again by Zann.
 Rogue appears in X-Men: Evolution, voiced by Meghan Black. The character is reimagined as a sullen and reclusive teenage goth girl, as the series' producers believed her absorption powers would make her isolated, cynical and insecure due to her desire to get close to others. She was adopted by Mystique as a child and raised by Irene Adler in Caldecott County, Mississippi. Her real name is never revealed in the series. Rogue is initially tricked into joining Mystique's Brotherhood, but soon defects to the X-Men. Throughout the series, she bonds with her younger foster brother Kurt Wagner, strikes a friendship with her roommate Kitty Pryde, develops an unrequited crush on Scott Summers, grows jealous of Jean Grey for Scott's affections, becomes attracted to one of Magneto's Acolytes, Gambit, and forms a father-daughter bond with Logan after he helps her regain control of her abilities. In the series finale, Rogue absorbs and uses Dorian Leach's powers to neutralize Apocalypse and trap him in his tomb forever. In Professor Charles Xavier's vision of the near future, Rogue is shown flying, no longer wearing gloves, and in a relationship with Gambit.
 Rogue appears in Wolverine and the X-Men, voiced by Kieren van den Blink. This version is a reserved individual who views Logan as a surrogate father and initially appears as a member of the X-Men until the pair get into an argument over him leaving the X-Men, Charles Xavier and Jean Grey disappear under mysterious circumstances, and the X-Men disband. A year later, Rogue seemingly joins the Brotherhood of Mutants to oppose Senator Robert Kelly's Mutant Registration Act, creating a rift between her and Logan when he reforms the X-Men. She is eventually revealed to be working as a double agent and rejoins the X-Men to foil Magneto's plot to instigate war between humanity and mutants.
 Rogue makes a minor non-speaking appearance in the Marvel Anime: X-Men episode "Destiny - Bond".

Film

Rogue appears in 20th Century Fox's X-Men film series, portrayed by Anna Paquin. This version's real name is Marie D'Ancanto and originally lived in Meridian, Mississippi
 First appearing in X-Men, 17-year-old Rogue's abilities emerge while kissing her boyfriend, inadvertently putting him into a coma in the process. She runs away to Alberta, Canada, where she meets Logan before they attacked by Sabretooth and saved by the X-Men, who bring the pair to Professor Charles Xavier's School for Gifted Youngsters. Shortly after enrolling, Rogue befriends Bobby Drake, but is unknowingly convinced by Mystique disguised as Drake to leave the school, allowing Magneto to kidnap her and use her abilities to power his mutation-inducing machine. The X-Men rescue her, with Logan transferring his healing factor to her to save her, though she is left with a permanent white streak in her hair.
 In X2, Rogue begins dating Drake despite her powers while aiding the X-Men in stopping William Stryker from using Cerebro to kill every mutant on Earth.
 In X-Men: The Last Stand, Rogue becomes interested in a "mutant cure" developed by Worthington Labs due to her powers straining her relationship with Drake, who is growing closer to Kitty Pryde. After seeking Logan's advice, Rogue ultimately takes the cure. In an alternate ending, she refuses to take the cure.
 Rogue makes a cameo appearance in the theatrical cut of X-Men: Days of Future Past while helping the X-Men avert a post-apocalyptic Sentinel-controlled future. According to director Bryan Singer, the majority of her scenes had been cut from this version of the film as her subplot "became extraneous". The scenes were later included in the director's cut, also known as the "Rogue Cut". In this version of events, Xavier, Drake, and Magneto lead a rescue mission to save Rogue from Cerebro's heavily-guarded remains, though Drake is killed in the process. After Logan unknowingly injures Pryde while she is helping him change the timeline, Rogue absorbs her powers and takes over for her. Once the mission succeeds and the timeline altered in both versions of the film, Rogue's relationship with Drake is restored.

Video games
 Rogue appears as a playable character in X-Men II: The Fall of the Mutants.
 Rogue appears in X-Men for Sega Genesis.
 Rogue appears as a playable character in X-Men for the Sega Game Gear.
 Rogue appears as a playable character in X-Men: Gamesmaster's Legacy.
 Rogue appears as a playable character in X-Men: Mojo World.
 Rogue appears as a playable character in X-Men vs. Street Fighter, voiced by Lenore Zann.
 Rogue appears as a guest character in Marvel vs. Capcom: Clash of Super Heroes.
 Rogue appears as a playable character in Marvel vs. Capcom 2: New Age of Heroes, voiced again by Zann.
 Rogue appears in X-Men: Mutant Academy 2, voiced by Megan Fahlenbock.
 Rogue appears in Spider-Man 2: Enter Electro, voiced again by Hale.
 Rogue appears in X2: Wolverine's Revenge, voiced again by Hale.
 Rogue appears as a playable character in X-Men: Next Dimension, voiced by Jennifer Hale.
 Rogue appears in X-Men Legends, voiced by Erin Matthews.
 Rogue appears in X-Men Legends II: Rise of Apocalypse, voiced by Catherine Taber.
 Rogue appears in LittleBigPlanet as part of the "Marvel Costume Kit 3" DLC.
 Rogue appears as a playable character in Marvel Super Hero Squad Online, voiced by Tara Strong.
 Rogue appears as a guest character in Ultimate Marvel vs. Capcom 3.
 Rogue appears as a playable character in Marvel Avengers Alliance.
 Rogue appears as a playable character in Marvel Heroes, voiced again by Taber.
 Rogue appears in Deadpool, voiced by Melissa Disney.
 Rogue appears as a boss, later playable character, in Marvel Contest of Champions.
 Rogue appears as a playable character in Marvel: Future Fight.
 Rogue appears as a playable character in Marvel Puzzle Quest.
 Rogue appears as an alternate skin in Fortnite Battle Royale.

Miscellaneous
 Rogue appears in the Wolverine versus Sabretooth motion comic, voiced by Kazumi Evans.
 The X-Men: The Animated Series incarnation of Rogue appears in the tie-in comics X-Men Adventures and The Adventures of the X-Men.
 Rogue appears in the Chaos Engine novel trilogy as a member of a team of X-Men who were in the Starlight Citadel when Doctor Doom used a Cosmic Cube to rewrite reality on Earth. While investigating the changes, Rogue gets infected by a techno-virus before she becomes a follower and a servant of Magneto and the Red Skull respectively when they make their own attempts to use the Cosmic Cube to alter reality to their liking. She is eventually rescued and has her memories restored before joining the X-Men in mounting an attack on the Red Skull.
 Rogue appears as a meet-and-greet character at Universal's Islands of Adventure's Marvel Super Hero Island.
 Rogue appears in the Wolverine versus Sabretooth motion comic, voiced by Kazumi Evans.

References